In some classifications, the Riff (Rif) languages are a branch of the Zenati Berber languages (Northern Berber), of the Rif area of Morocco, that includes Riffian, one of the major Berber languages.

Blench (2006) considers Riff to be a dialect cluster, consisting of the following varieties:

Riffian
Ghomara
Shawiya
Tidikelt
Tuat
Tlemcen
Sheliff Basin

References

 
Berber languages
Languages of Algeria
Berbers in Morocco
Languages of Morocco